Leesylvania State Park is located in the southeastern part of Prince William County, Virginia. The land was donated in 1978 by philanthropist Daniel K. Ludwig, and the park was dedicated in 1985 and opened full-time in 1992.

History

At the time of early English settlers, Leesylvania was believed to be the site of an Algonquian village, overlooking Neabsco Creek.

Henry Lee II settled on the land from 1747 until his death in 1787. He and his wife had eight children at their home including Revolutionary War hero Henry "Light Horse Harry" Lee.  He is also the grandfather to Civil War general Robert E. Lee. George Washington mentions visiting the Lee House three times in his diaries.

In 1825 the property was sold to Henry Fairfax, and later passed to John Fairfax in 1847.  Fairfax later served as a staff aide to Confederate Lt. General James Longstreet. The site was Fairfax's boyhood home, and he returned to live on the property in late 1875, remaining there until his death in 1908.
The land was also used as a small Confederate force and gun emplacement during the Civil War. The Freestone Point Confederate Battery was listed on the National Register of Historic Places in 1989. The battery engaged with vessels of the US Navy's Potomac Flotilla on September 25, 1861.  There were no casualties on either side, but the Federal vessels withdrew at the conclusion of the fighting. (Ref: Official Records of the Union and Confederate Navies in The War of The Rebellion)

Today, only a small cornerstone of the Lee House remains. The house and its path were completely bulldozed in the 1950s to make way for a road. A restored chimney of the Fairfax House remains. Henry Lee II and his wife, along with Henry Fairfax and his third wife are buried on the property. The sites and the cemetery are accessible by trail.  The Leesylvania Archeological Site was listed on the National Register of Historic Places in 1984.

Recreation
The park has a small group-only campground, five hiking trails, fishing pier, boat ramp, visitor center, natural sand beach, and four picnic shelters.

References

External links

 Leesylvania State Park
 Hiking at Leeslyvania State Park
Leesylvania (Ruins), State Route 610, Dumfries, Prince William County, VA: 2 photos at Historic American Buildings Survey

Historic American Buildings Survey in Virginia
Archaeological sites on the National Register of Historic Places in Virginia
Fairfax family residences
Lee family residences
Parks in Prince William County, Virginia
State parks of Virginia
Houses in Virginia
Plantations in Virginia
Protected areas established in 1985
1985 establishments in Virginia
National Register of Historic Places in Prince William County, Virginia